Hawthorne is a neighborhood in the Near North community in Minneapolis. Its boundaries are Lowry Avenue North to the north, the Mississippi River to the east, West Broadway to the south, and Emerson Avenue North to the west. The neighborhood is named in honor of 19th Century American author Nathaniel Hawthorne.

Demographics

Based on Census 2000 figures, the neighborhood's ethnic makeup changed significantly between 1980 and 2000. All ethnic groups except whites and American Indians increased in number. The white population dropped from 85 percent of the population in 1980 to 19 percent in 2000. During that same time period, the black population increased from 5 percent to 50 percent, and the Asian population grew from less than 1 percent to 17 percent.

The Census 2000 also indicated that children and adolescents increased by almost 30 percent, and the school-age population in particular (5 to 17 years old) grew by 93 percent. In 2000, Hawthorne saw nearly 3 percent fewer adults and 60 percent fewer senior residents than in 1980. As a result, the total population decreased slightly. The neighborhood has an average of 3.4 people living in each house in Hawthorne. The median income is $21,865 per year.

Hawthorne Area Community Council
The Hawthorne Area Community Council was originally established in the 1970s as a 501 (c) 3 non-profit organization serving the 6,000 residents in the Hawthorne area neighborhood.

The board of directors is composed of representatives from 4 quadrants as well as at-large, non-profit, youth and business representatives who are elected for their terms during the annual meeting typically held in the Fall at Farview Park.  The organization's staff size has varied over the years.

The Hawthorne Area Community Council works on active programs of community engagement. The primary newsletter is the Hawthorne Vibe that is published on a quarterly basis by the organization.

The Hawthorne neighborhood is also the home of Farview Park, the oldest park of Minneapolis, the Nellie Stone Johnson School, and the Orvin Olson Park near the Mississippi River.

References

External links

Minneapolis Neighborhood Profile - Hawthorne
Hawthorne Area Community Council
http://hawthornevoices.blogspot.com

Neighborhoods in Minneapolis
Minnesota populated places on the Mississippi River